This article is about the list of C.D. Primeiro de Agosto (basketball) players.  Clube Desportivo Primeiro de Agosto is an Angolan basketball club based in Luanda, Angola and plays at Pavilhão Victorino Cunha.  The club was established in 1977.

2011–2018

2001–2010
C.D. Primeiro de Agosto basketball players 2001–2010  = Angola league winner; = African champions cup winner

1991–2000
C.D. Primeiro de Agosto basketball players 1991–2000<small> = Angola league winner</small>

1981–1990C.D. Primeiro de Agosto basketball players 1981–1990''' = Angola league winner

See also
 List of C.D. Primeiro de Agosto women's basketball players
 List of C.D. Primeiro de Agosto (football) players
 List of Angola national basketball team players

References

C.D. Primeiro de Agosto basketball players